The following is a list of districts and sub-districts in Denpasar City. Denpasar City has 4 district, 16 sub-district, and 27 village. In 2017, the population estimated 638.548 with area 127,78 km² and density 4.997 people/km².

List of districts and sub-districts in Denpasar City as follows:

See also 
 List of districts of Indonesia
 List of districts of Bali
 Subdivisions of Indonesia

References

External links 
  Bali Province Official website
  Denpasar City Official Website
  Official Website Statistical Bureau of Denpasar City

Denpasar City